Jake Anderson (born January 22, 1992) is an American professional rugby player who currently plays for Olympic Club RFC and is best known for playing for the United States national rugby union team at the 2016 Americas Rugby Championship.

Career 
Anderson plays for the semi-professional Olympic Club RFC in the Pacific Rugby Premiership.

On March 5, 2016, he made his debut for the United States national rugby union team as a substitute replacement at the 2016 Americas Rugby Championship.

He has a total of five caps for the USA Eagles.

Anderson plays mostly at full-back, but also as a wing.

References 

American rugby union players
United States international rugby union players
1992 births
Living people
Rugby union fullbacks